The Pregolya or Pregola is a river in the Russian Kaliningrad Oblast exclave.

Name
A possible ancient name by Ptolemy of the Pregolya River is Chronos (from Germanic *hrauna, "stony"), although other theories identify Chronos as a much larger river, the Nemunas.

The oldest recorded names of the river are Prigora (1302), Pregor (1359), Pregoll, Pregel (1331), Pregill (1460). Georg Gerullis connected the name with Lithuanian prãgaras, pragorė̃ ("abyss") and the Lithuanian verb gérti ("drink"). Vytautas Mažiulis instead derived it from spragė́ti or sprógti ("burst") and the suffix -ara ("river").

Overview
It starts as a confluence of the Instruch and the Angrapa and drains into the Baltic Sea through the Vistula Lagoon. Its length under the name of Pregolya is 123 km, 292 km including the Angrapa. The basin has an area of 15,500 km2. The average flow is 90 m3/s.

Euler's Seven Bridges of Königsberg problem was based on the bridges crossing the river in Königsberg (now Kaliningrad).

Cities and towns
Chernyakhovsk
Znamensk
Gvardeysk
Kaliningrad

Tributaries
Pissa 
Lava/Łyna
Angrapa 
Instruch

See also
List of rivers of Russia
Bridges of Konigsberg problem

References

Rivers of Kaliningrad Oblast